The 38th Annual Bengal Film Journalists' Association Awards
were held on 1975, honoring the best
Indian cinema in 1974.

Main Awards

Best India Film 

 Ankur
 Chorus
 Garm Hava
 Rajnigandha
 Chhenra Tamsuk
 Sonar Kella
 Namak Haraam
 Sujata
 Jadubangsha
 Phuleswari

Best Director 

 Mrinal Sen – Chorus

Best Actor 

 Uttam Kumar – Amanush

Best Actress 

 Aparna Sen – Sujata

Best Supporting Actor 

 Ashit Bandopadhyay – Chorus

Best Supporting Actress 

 Sumitra Mukherjee – Debi Choudhurani

Best Music Director 

 Hemanta Mukherjee – Phuleswari

Best Lyricist 

 Mukul Dutta – Phuleswari

Best Male Playback Singer 

 Hemanta Mukherjee – Phuleswari

Best Female Playback Singer 

 Arundhati Holme Chowdhury – Je Jekhane Danriye

Best Screenplay 

 Mrinal Sen – Chorus

Best Cinematography (Black & White) 

 K. K. Mahajan – Chorus

Best Cinematography (Colour) 

 Soumendu Roy – Sonar Kella

Best Art Director 

 Shanti Das – Amanush

Best Editor 

 Gangadhar Naskar – Chorus

Best Audiography 

 J. D. Irani & Anil Talukdar – Sonar Kella

Hindi Film Section

Best Director 

 Shyam Benegal – Ankur

Best Actor 

 Rajesh Khanna – Namak Haraam

Best Actress 

 Shabana Azmi – Ankur

Best Supporting Actor 

 Sadhu Meher – Ankur

Best Supporting Actress 

 Mousumi Chatterjee – Kora Kagaz

Best Music Director 

 Kalyanji-Anandji – Kora Kagaz

Best Lyricist 

 M. G. Hashmat – Kora Kagaz

Best Male Playback Singer 

 Kishore Kumar – Kora Kagaz

Best Female Playback Singer 

 Lata Mangeshkar – Kora Kagaz

Best Screenplay 

 Shyam Benegal – Ankur

Best Cinematography (Colour) 

 Jal Mistry – Hindustan Ki Kasam

Best Art Director 

 B. D. Jadhav – Pinjra

Best Editor 

 G. G. Mayekar – Rajnigandha

Best Audiography 

 Mukul Basu – Hindustan Ki Kasam

Most Outstanding Work of The Year 
 Late Balraj Sahni – Garm Hava

Foreign Film Section

Best Film 

  – The French Connection

Best Director 

 William Friedkin – The French Connection

References 

1974 film awards
Bengal Film Journalists' Association Awards
1975 in Indian cinema